In probability theory, Ville's inequality provides an upper bound on the probability that a supermartingale exceeds a certain value. The inequality is named after Jean Ville, who proved it in 1939.
The inequality has applications in statistical testing.

Statement 
Let  be a non-negative supermartingale. Then, for any real number 

The inequality is a generalization of Markov's inequality.

References

Probabilistic inequalities
Martingale theory